Leonard E. Lindquist (September 5, 1912 – September 10, 2004) was an American lawyer and politician.

Lindquist was born in Minneapolis, Minnesota. He served in the United States Navy during World War II. Lindquist received his law degree from University of Minnesota Law School and practiced law in Minneapolis, where he co-founded the firm later known as Lindquist & Vennum in 1946.

He lived in Minneapolis with his wife and family. Lindquist served in the Minnesota House of Representatives from 1955 to 1958 and was a Republican. He died at Northwestern Hospital Hospital, in Minneapolis, from complications from a fall. His funeral and burial was in Minneapolis.

References

1912 births
2004 deaths
Lawyers from Minneapolis
Military personnel from Minneapolis
Politicians from Minneapolis
University of Minnesota Law School alumni
Republican Party members of the Minnesota House of Representatives
Accidental deaths in Minnesota